Okechukwu is a both given name and a surname. Notable people with the name include:

Given name
Okechukwu Amah, Nigerian academic
Okechukwu Emeka (born 1962), Nigerian politician; also known as John Okechukwuemeka
Okechukwu Nwadiuto Emuchay (born 1960), Nigerian politician
Okechukwu Ibeanu, Nigerian professor
Okechukwu Christian Irobiso (born 1993), Nigerian footballer
Okechukwu Odita (born 1983), Nigerian footballer
Okechukwu Okoroha (born 1990), Nigerian player of American football
Okechukwu Edwards Ukeje, Nigerian rapper; also known as Mr Raw
Okechukwu Ukeje (born 1981), Nigerian actor; also known as OC Ukeje

Surname
Aliyu Okechukwu (born 1995), Nigerian footballer
Azubuike Okechukwu (born 1997), Nigerian footballer
Duncan Wene Mighty Okechukwu (born 1983), Nigerian musician; also known as Duncan Mighty
Salas Okechukwu (born 1989), Nigerian footballer
Uche Okechukwu (born 1967), Nigerian footballer

Other
Victor Okechukwu Agali (born 1978), Nigerian footballer
Jake Okechukwu Effoduh (born 1987), Nigerian radio personality
Eric Okechukwu Ejiofor (born 1979), Nigerian footballer
Stephen Okechukwu Keshi (born 1962), Nigerian footballer
Herbert Okechukwu Maduagwu, Nigerian boxer; also known as Herbie Hide
Sebastian Okechukwu Mezu (born 1941), Nigerian writer
Daniel Okechukwu Olerum (born 1983), Nigerian footballer
Ogbonna Okechukwu Onovo, Nigerian police officer
Michael Okechukwu Uchebo (born 1990), Nigerian footballer